With/In is a 2021 American anthological drama film that revolves around themes of confinement and isolation.

The film was released in two volumes at the Tribeca Film Festival on June 13 and 14, 2021.

Filmmakers and cast

Volume 1

Volume 2

Production
At the end of July 2020 it was announced that Julianne Moore, Don Cheadle, Sanaa Lathan, Rebecca Hall, Chris Cooper, Alessandro Nivola, Emily Mortimer, Rosie Perez and Debra Winger are part of the star cast of the film With/In, a film anthology that revolves around themes of confinement and isolation. During post-production the film was split into two parts.

Release
The film had its world premiere at the Tribeca Film Festival on June 13 and 14, 2021.

References

External links
  (Volume 1)
  (Volume 2)

2021 films
American anthology films
Films about the COVID-19 pandemic
Films directed by Bart Freundlich
2021 drama films
2020s English-language films